Avitta subsignans is a moth of the family Noctuidae first described by Francis Walker in 1858. It is found in the Indian subregion and Sri Lanka.

Larval food plants include Cyclea peltata and Stephania japonica.

References

Moths of Asia
Moths described in 1858
Catocalinae